Western lifestyle or cowboy culture is the lifestyle, or behaviorisms, of, and resulting from the influence of, the (often romanticized) attitudes, ethics and history of the American Western cowboy. In the present day these influences affect this sector of the population's choice of recreation, clothing, and consumption of goods.

Origins
The origins of cowboy culture go back to the Spanish who settled in New Mexico and later Texas bringing cattle. Prior to the 19th century, ranchers were primarily Spanish while those working it were Indigenous. By the late 1800s, one in three cowboys were Mexican and brought to the lifestyle its iconic symbols of hats, bandanas, spurs, stirrups, lariat, and lasso. With westward movement brought many distinct ethnicities all with their own cultural traditions. Welsh Americans, as one example, had a history in Wales of cattle and sheep droving, that incorporated well into ranch work.

Dime novels

Beginning in the 1860s, dime novels began sharing erroneous and highly romanticized tales of the West, feeding the public's interest in the trade and life West of the Mississippi.

Radio, film and television

Throughout the 20th century, radio, film and television had a profound effect on the fashion and mannerisms that built the foundation of what it meant to be living a Western lifestyle, however most of this was more Hollywood glitz and glamour than historical narrative.

Revival
In the 1980s, following the urbanization of much of the Texas population, there was a marked revival of cowboy culture with the creation of a number of organizations devoted to its preservation, among them the American Cowboy Culture Association.

Notable people
The following is a list of notable people who lived or are living a Western lifestyle post to its technological and societal change at the beginning of the 20th century. This list does not include those of whom lived during the 19th century who were living in what was considered the Old West and preoccupied with the Western norms of the day.

To be included in this list, the person must be notable and either have a Wikipedia article showing they were or are influenced by the Western lifestyle or must have references showing their claim. This is not a list for artists or entertainers who were playing a Western role or create a subject of Western art for which they are only credited. Likewise, it is neither for a politician who has only been photographed in a cowboy hat for an event, nor a celebrity who wears cowboy boots. Many included in this list participated in multiple classifications and are solely placed under the classification they were most recognized.

Art
 
Joe Beeler 
Elsa Spear Byron, photographer
Evelyn Cameron, photographer, writer
Deborah Copenhaver Fellows, sculptor
Edward S. Curtis, photographer 
L. Frank
Laura Gilpin, photographer
Veryl Goodnight, sculptor
Hildred Goodwine, illustrator
Maria Martinez
Georgia O'Keeffe 
George Phippen
Frederic Remington, painter
Charles Marion Russell
Howard Terpning
Frank McCarthy

Business
 
Minnie Lou Bradley, president of the American Angus Association
Nellie Cashman
Nudie Cohn
Mary Colter, architect
Margaret Formby, founder of National Cowgirl Museum and Hall of Fame 
Temple Grandin, inventor
Enid Justin, founder of Nocona Boot Company 
Anne Windfohr Marion, founder of the Georgia O'Keeffe Museum
Anna Mebus Martin
Mollie Taylor Stevenson Jr., founder of the American Cowboy Museum 
Jackie Worthington, founder of the Girls Rodeo Association

Film and television

Rex Allen, actor
Wilford Brimley, actor, singer, cowboy
Yakima Canutt, rodeo champion, actor, director 
Sunset Carson, actor
Iron Eyes Cody, actor
Robert Conrad, actor, singer
Eddie Dean, singer, actor 
Joey Rocketshoes Dillon, singer-songwriter, gunslinger, actor, comedian
Helen Gibson actor, stunt woman
Hoot Gibson
Lorne Greene, actor, singer
William S. Hart, actor, director, writer
Jack Hoxie, rodeo performer, actor
Al Jennings
Ben Johnson, actor, stuntman, rodeo champion
Lash LaRue, actor
Tom Mix, actor
Clayton Moore, actor
Slim Pickens, actor, rodeo performer
Ronald Reagan, actor, Former U.S. President 
Charles Starrett, actor
Bob Steele, actor
Will Roberts, actor
Will Rogers, actor, lasso expert, comedian, philanthropist
Wes Studi, actor
Fred Thompson, actor
Tom Tyler, actor
John Wayne, actor
Dennis Weaver, actor, environmental activist

Music

Roy Acuff
Tommy Allsup
Lynne Anderson
Gene Autry, actor, singer-songwriter
Junior Barnard
Bill Barwick
Joe Bethancourt
Johnny Bond
Bill Boyd
Cecil Brower
Milton Brown
Joe Carr
Bill Carson
Wilf Carter
Johnny Cash
Al Clauser
Patsy Cline
Hurshul Clothier
Cowboy Copas
Eddie Dean, singer, actor 
Little Jimmy Dickens
Jimmie Dolan
Tommy Duncan
Bob Dunn
Don Edwards
Dale Evans, actor, singer
Juni Fisher
Curley Fletcher
Scott Franklin
Porky Freeman
Lefty Frizzell
Girls of the Golden West
Jack Guthrie
Monte Hale, actor, singer
Tom T. Hall
Adolph Hofner
Johnny Horton
Billy Hughes
Prince Albert Hunt
Wanda Jackson
Frankie Laine
Fred LaBour
Chris LeDoux, singer, rodeo champion
Merl Lindsay
Corb Lund and the Hurtin' Albertans
Rose Maddox
Joe Maphis
Leon McAuliffe
Patsy Montana
Tiny Moore
Moon Mullican
Michael Martin Murphey 
Red Murrell
Willie Nelson
Bob Nolan
Buck Owens
Webb Pierce
Ray Price
The Quebe Sisters Band
Leon Rausch
Riders in the Sky
Tex Ritter
Jimmie Rodgers
Marty Robbins
Roy Rogers, actor, singer
Smokey Rogers
Tom Russell
Eldon Shamblin
Arkie Shibley
Hank Snow
Sons of the San Joaquin
Sons of the Pioneers
Tim Spencer
Red Steagall
Dave Stogner
Hank Thompson
Ernest Tubb
Ian Tyson
Porter Wagoner
Jimmy Wakely
Cindy Walker
Kitty Wells
Johnny Western
Speedy West
Paul Westmoreland
John I. White
Ray Whitley
Slim Whitman
Hank Williams
Tex Williams
Bob Wills

Literature

 Andy Adams, fiction writer
 Don Bendell, author, rancher
 Eulalia Bourne
 Matt Braun, author, rancher
 Willa Cather
 Ralph Compton
 Robert J. Conley
 Walt Coburn, author and son of the founder of the noted Circle C Ranch
 Angie Debo
 Chris Enss
 Zane Grey, author and dentist
 Fred Grove
 Laura Ingalls Wilder, author
 Craig Johnson, author
 Terry C. Johnston
 Elmer Kelton
 Mike Kearby, author and inventor
 Louis L'Amour, novelist and short story writer
 Caroline Lockhart, journalist and author
 Stan Lynde, author and illustrator
 Lorin Morgan-Richards, author and illustrator
 Mari Sandoz
 Elizabeth Savage
 Thomas Savage
 Jack Schaefer

Poetry

 S. Omar Barker
 Baxter Black
 Arthur Chapman
 Badger Clark
 Curley Fletcher
 Bruce Kiskaddon
 Wally McRae
 Joel Nelson
 Red Steagall
 Steven Fromholz
 Waddie Mitchell
 Paul Zarzyski

Politics

Ben Nighthorse Campbell
Ronald Reagan

Rodeo and Wild West performer

Tillie Baldwin
Faye Blackstone
Earl W. Bascom, most decorated rodeo performer and an inventor of rodeo equipment, inducted into both American and Canadian pro rodeo halls of fame
Everett Bowman
Louis Brooks
Trevor Brazile, world rodeo champion
Ann Lowdon Call, Pleasure Driving champion
Clay Carr
Roy Cooper
Tom R. Ferguson
Lewis Feild
Bee Ho Gray
Prairie Rose Henderson, bronc rider
Ryan Jarrett Hall of Fame rodeo champion 
Bill Linderman
Phil Lyne
Larry Mahan
Bonnie McCarroll
Vera McGinnis
Dan Mortensen
Lucille Mulhall
Ty Murray
Annie Oakley
Alice Greenough Orr
Lulu Bell Parr
Benny Reynolds
Ruth Roach
Fern Sawyer
Jim Shoulders
Fannie Sperry Steele
Buck Taylor
Casey Tibbs, rodeo performer and actor
Fred Whitfield, rodeo performer

Barrel racing

Mary Burger
Wanda Harper Bush
Sherry Cervi
Charmayne James
Martha Josey
Mary Walker

Bull riding

Art Acord, rodeo champion, actor
Warren G. Brown
J.W. Harris
Tuff Hedeman
Scott Mendes
Shane Proctor
Charles Sampson, bull rider
Jim "Razor" Sharp
Wesley Silcox
Jan Youren

Roping

Mary Ellen (Dude) Barton
Buck Brannaman
Florence LaDue
Dave Thornbury, lasso expert, trick rider

Riding

Anna Lee Aldred, trick rider
Ken Maynard, trick rider, actor
Pat North Ommert, trick rider, actor

Steer wrestling

Bill Pickett
Cowboy Morgan Evans

Notable livestock and companions

Bucking bulls 

Bushwacker, three-time World Champion Professional Bull Riders (PBR) bucking bull, PBR Heroes & Legends Celebration: Brand of Honor bull
Bodacious, Professional Rodeo Cowboys Association (PRCA) and PBR champion title holder, "world's most dangerous bull," Hall of Fame bull
Bruiser, (2016-2018) consecutive three-time World Champion PBR bucking bull, 2017 PRCA Bucking Bull of the Year, in the running in 2019 to become first 4-time world champion
Little Yellow Jacket (2002-2004) consecutive three-time World Champion PBR bucking bull, PBR Heroes and Legends inaugural 2011 Brand of Honor bull

Entertainment horses 

Budweiser Clydesdales 
Buttermilk, Dale Evans horse
Champion the Wonder Horse, Gene Autry's on screen companion, previously owned by Tom Mix
Fritz, William S. Hart's silent film riding and stunt red pinto. 
Trigger, Roy Rogers companion palomino.

Rodeo horses 

Scamper, 10 Women's Professional Rodeo Association World Barrel Racing Championships, 7 National Finals Rodeo Average championships, first barrel horse inducted into ProRodeo Hall of Fame
Scottie, steer wrestling, the chestnut gelding was able to take three cowboys to four world championships, hall of fame horse

Notable entities

Businesses

Aztec Land & Cattle Company
Buck Owens Crystal Palace, Western themed restaurant and music hall
High Noon Western Americana, Western art and antique auction house
LongHorn Steakhouse, Western and Texas themed restaurant chain
Roadhouse, Western themed restaurant chain
Saddle Ranch Chop House, Western themed restaurant chain

Events

Frontier Days (rodeo)
Santa Clarita Cowboy Festival
Stagecoach Days (Banning, California) 
Western Heritage Awards

Ghost towns open for tourism

Abilene, Kansas
Aspen, Colorado
Bandera, Texas
Bannack, Montana
Bishop, California
Bodie, California
Buffalo, Wyoming
Calico Ghost town
Columbia, California
Cody, Wyoming
Deadwood, South Dakota
Dodge City, Kansas
Dunton Hot Springs, Colorado
Durango, Colorado
Elk Falls, Kansas
Fort Smith, Arkansas
Garnet, Montana
Idaho City, Idaho
Jerome, Arizona
Julian, California
Kennecott, Alaska
Laramie, Wyoming
Lincoln, New Mexico
Oatman, Arizona
Old Town San Diego, California
Randsburg, California
Rhyolite, Nevada 
Sheridan, Wyoming
St. Elmo, Colorado
Telluride, Colorado
Tombstone, Arizona
Trinidad, Colorado
Virginia City, Montana
Vulture Mine, Arizona

Historic Properties

Dalton Gang Hideout and Museum
Winchester Mystery House

Movie ranches still in operation

Big Sky Ranch
Golden Oak Ranch
Melody Ranch
Paramount Ranch
Old Tucson Studios
Pioneertown, California
Southfork Ranch
Will Rogers State Historic Park

Museums

Autry Museum of the American West
Bull Riding Hall of Fame 
Colorado Springs Pioneer Museum
National Cowboy & Western Heritage Museum
National Cowgirl Museum and Hall of Fame
Oakdale Cowboy Museum
Old Cowtown Museum in Wichita, Kansas
ProRodeo Hall of Fame
Roy Rogers-Dale Evans Museum, defunct
Western Heritage Center
Western Heritage Museum and Lea County Cowboy Hall of Fame

Organizations

Academy of Western Artists
Academy of Country Music
American Cowboy Culture Association
 Cowboy Cartoonists International
 Cowboy Heritage Association of Fort Worth
Professional Rodeo Cowboys Association
Western Writers of America 
Women's Professional Rodeo Association

Theme Parks

The American Adventure Theme Park
Attractiepark Slagharen
Bobbejaanland
Bonnie Springs Ranch
Buckskin Joe
Cowboyland 
Fraispertuis City
Frontier City
Frontierland, Morecambe
Ghost Town & Calico Railroad
Ghost Town Village
Gold Gulch
High Chaparral Theme Park
Hillerstorp
Knotts Berry Farm ghost town
Marshal Scotty's Playland Park
Mini Hollywood
Old Tucson Studios
Old Vegas
Six Gun Territory 
Texas Hollywood
Western Leone
Wild Waves Theme Park
Wild West City 
Wild West World

Competitions

Cowboy action shooting

Notable media

Print

Canadian Cowboy Country Magazine
Cowboys & Indians Magazine
True West Magazine

See also
Gaucho culture
Cowboy church
Rodeo
Western (genre) 
Cowboy poetry 
Western comics 
Western music (North America)
Western fiction 
Singing cowboy 
Spaghetti Western 
List of Spaghetti Western films 
Western wear

References

External links

 

 
Culture of the Western United States
Lifestyle
 Western Lifestyle
 
American Old West-related lists
American frontier
People of the American Old West
Subcultures
 
Lifestyles
Canadian culture